Bossiaea buxifolia, commonly known as matted bossiaea, is a species of flowering plant in the family Fabaceae and is endemic to south-eastern Australia. It is a prostrate to weakly erect shrub with elliptic to egg-shaped or almost round leaves and yellow, red and purplish flowers.

Description

Taxonomy
Bossiaea buxifolia was first formally described in 1825 by Allan Cunningham who found it growing "upon rocky, brushy hills" and published the description in the chapter "On the Botany of the Blue Mountains" of Barron Field's book, Geographical Memoirs on New South Wales. The specific epithet (buxifolia) means "box-tree-leaved".

Distribution and habitat
Matted bossiaea grows in forest and woodland occurs south from Kroombit Tops National Park in south-eastern Queensland, along the coast and tablelands of eastern New South Wales and the Australian Capital Territory to the ranges east of Omeo in eastern Victoria.

References

Mirbelioids
buxifolia
Flora of the Australian Capital Territory
Flora of New South Wales
Flora of Queensland
Flora of Victoria (Australia)
Taxa named by Allan Cunningham (botanist)
Plants described in 1825